Julian Priester (born June 29, 1935) is an American jazz trombonist and occasional euphoniumist. He is sometimes credited "Julian Priester Pepo Mtoto". He has played with Sun Ra, Max Roach, Duke Ellington, John Coltrane, and Herbie Hancock.

Biography
He was born in Chicago, Illinois, United States. Priester attended Chicago's DuSable High School, where he studied under Walter Dyett. In his teens he played with blues and R&B artists such as Muddy Waters, and Bo Diddley, and had the opportunity to jam with jazz players such as the saxophonist Sonny Stitt.

In the early 1950s, Priester was a member of Sun Ra's big band, recording several albums with the group, before leaving Chicago in 1956 to tour with Lionel Hampton, and he then joined Dinah Washington in 1958. The following year he settled in New York and joined the group led by drummer Max Roach, who heard him playing on the Philly Joe Jones album, "Blues for Dracula" (1958). While playing in Roach's group, Priester also recorded two albums as a leader, Keep Swingin' and Spiritsville, both of which were recorded and released by Riverside (the latter by their Jazzland subsidiary) in 1960.

Priester recorded two albums with trumpeter Booker Little in 1961, Out Front and Booker Little and Friend (also known as Victory and Sorrow), the first also features Roach, and Priester took part in the sessions for John Coltrane's Africa/Brass album (on which he played euphonium), which was recorded in the same year. He left Roach's band during 1961, and between then and 1969 appeared as a sideman on albums led by Freddie Hubbard, Stanley Turrentine, Blue Mitchell, Art Blakey, Joe Henderson, McCoy Tyner, Johnny Griffin, and Sam Rivers. In 1969, he accepted an offer to play with Duke Ellington's big band, and he stayed with that ensemble for six months, before leaving in 1970 to join pianist Herbie Hancock's fusion sextet.

After leaving the Hancock band in 1973, Priester moved to San Francisco, where he recorded two more albums as a leader: Love, Love in 1974 and 1977's Polarization. In 1979 he joined the faculty of Cornish College of the Arts in Seattle, where he taught jazz composition, performance, and history until retiring in 2011.

In the 1980s, he became a member of the Dave Holland's quintet, and also returned to Sun Ra's band for a few recordings. The 1990s saw the addition of Charlie Haden's Liberation Music Orchestra to his schedule. Priester was co-leader with drummer Jimmy Bennington on 'Portraits and Silhouettes' which received an Honorable Mention in All About Jazz New York's 'Best Recordings of 2007', which culminated with the two musicians appearing at the 30th Annual Chicago Jazz Festival. Priester also performs on the album Monoliths & Dimensions, by the drone metal band Sunn 0))), released in May 2009.  His major contributions were to the final track of the album, "Alice," a tribute to Alice Coltrane.

In addition to teaching and touring, Priester continues to record albums under his own name. He released Hints on Light and Shadow (with Sam Rivers and Tucker Martine) in 1997 and followed it in 2003 with In Deep End Dance.

As of the beginning of 2022, Julian hosted listening sessions early on Wednesday evenings in Seattle as a part of a Jazz Fellowship, at Vermillion Art Gallery and Bar.

Discography

As leader or co-leader
 1960: Keep Swingin' (Riverside)
 1960: Spiritsville (Jazzland)
 1973: Love, Love (ECM)
 1977: Polarization (ECM)
 1997: Hints on Light and Shadow  with Sam Rivers (Postcards)
 2001: Out of This World with Walter Benton (Milestone)
 2002: In Deep End Dance (Conduit)
 2007: Portraits and Silhouettes with Jimmy Bennington (That Swan)
 2008: Formations with Marcus Wood
 2010: Conversational Music with Aaron Alexander
 2012: Blue Stride

As sideman
With Jane Ira Bloom
 The Nearness (Arabesque, 1996)
With Anthony Braxton
 Composition No. 96 (Leo, 1981 [1989])
With Donald Byrd
 Fancy Free, (Blue Note, 1970)
With Jay Clayton
 Live at Jazz Alley (ITM, 1995)
With John Coltrane
 Africa/Brass, (Impulse!, 1961)
With Duke Ellington
 New Orleans Suite (Atlantic, 1971)
 The Intimate Ellington (Pablo, 1969–71 [1977])
 Up in Duke's Workshop (Pablo, 1969–72 [1979])
With Robben Ford
 Blues Connotation (1996)
 City Lights (2006)
With David Friesen, Eddie Moore, Jim Pepper, and Mal Waldron
 Remembering the Moment (Soul Note, 1987)
With Red Garland
 So Long Blues (Galaxy, 1979 [1984])
 Strike Up the Band (Galaxy, 1979 [1981])
With Jerry Granelli
 Koputai (ITM, 1990)
 One Day at a Time (ITM, 1990)
 A Song I Thought I Heard Buddy Sing (ITM, 1992)
 Another Place (Intuition, 1994)
With Johnny Griffin
 The Little Giant (Riverside, 1959)
With George Gruntz
 Theatre (ECM, 1983)
With Carolyn Graye
 Carolyn Graye (Pony Boy, 2005)
With Charlie Haden
 Helium Tears (By, 2006)
With Herbie Hancock
 Mwandishi (Warner Bros., 1970) 
 Crossings (Herbie Hancock album) (Warner Bros., 1972)
 Sextant (album) (Columbia, 1973)
With David Haney
 Caramel Topped Terrier (Cadence, 2001)
With Billy Harper
 Capra Black (Strata-East, 1973)
With Eddie Henderson
 Sunburst (Blue Note, 1975)
 Heritage (Blue Note, 1976)
 Comin' Through (Capitol, 1977)
 Mahal (Capitol, 1978)
With Andrew Hill
 Passing Ships (Blue Note, 1969)
With Dave Holland
 Jumpin' In (ECM, 1984)
 Seeds of Time (ECM, 1985)
With Wayne Horvitz
 4+1 Ensemble (Intuition, 1996 [1998])
 From a Window (Avant, 2000)
With Freddie Hubbard
 Hub Cap (Blue Note, 1961)
With Bobbi Humphrey
 Fancy Dancer (Blue Note, 1975)
With Philly Joe Jones
 Blues for Dracula (Riverside, 1958)
 Showcase (Riverside, 1959)
With Clifford Jordan
 These are My Roots: Clifford Jordan Plays Leadbelly (Atlantic, 1965)
 Soul Fountain (Vortex, 1966 [1970])
 In the World (Strata-East, 1969 [1972])
 Masters from Different Worlds (Mapleshade, 1989 [1994]) with Ran Blake
 The Mellow Side of Clifford Jordan (Mapleshade, 1989-91 [1997])
With Eyvind Kang
 Visible Breath (2011)
With Azar Lawrence
 Bridge into the New Age (Prestige, 1974)
With Abbey Lincoln
Abbey Is Blue (Riverside, 1959)
 Straight Ahead (Candid, 1961)
With Booker Little
 Out Front (Candid, 1961)
 Booker Little and Friend (Bethlehem, 1961)
With Herbie Mann
 Impressions of the Middle East (Atlantic, 1966)
With Pat Metheny
 Move to the Groove (Westwind, 2000)
With Blue Mitchell
 Smooth as the Wind (1961)
 Boss Horn (1966)* 
 Heads Up! (1968)*
With Lee Morgan
 Sonic Boom (Blue Note, 1967)
With Duke Pearson
 Introducing Duke Pearson's Big Band (Blue Note, 1967)
With Buddy Rich
 Rich Versus Roach (1959)
With Sam Rivers
 Dimensions & Extensions (Blue Note, 1967)
With Max Roach
 The Many Sides of Max (Mercury, 1959 [1964])
 Quiet as It's Kept (Mercury, 1959)
 Moon Faced and Starry Eyed (Mercury, 1959)
 Long as You're Living (Enja, 1960 [1984])
 Parisian Sketches (Mercury, 1960)
 We Insist!, (Candid, 1960)
 Percussion Bitter Sweet (Impulse!, 1961)
 Max Roach and Friends Vol. 2 (1961)
 It's Time (Impulse!, 1962)
With Paul Schutze
 Site Anubis (Big Cat, 1996)
With Lonnie Smith
 Turning Point, (1969)
With Sunn O)))
 Monoliths & Dimensions (Southern Lord, 2009)
With Sun Ra
 Super-Sonic Jazz (Saturn, 1956)
 Jazz by Sun Ra (Saturn, 1956)
 Angels and Demons at Play (Saturn, 1956)
 Sound of Joy (1957)
 Jazz in Silhouette (1958)
 Angels and Demons at Play (1960)
 Lanquidity (Philly Jazz, 1978)
 Blue Delight (A&M, 1989)
 Purple Night (A&M, 1990)
 Somewhere Else (Rounder, 1993)
 Second Star to the Right: Salute to Walt Disney (Leo, 1995)
With Cal Tjader
El Sonido Nuevo (Verve, 1967) with Eddie Palmieri
With Stanley Turrentine
 The Spoiler (Blue Note, 1966)
 A Bluish Bag (Blue Note, 1967)
With McCoy Tyner
 Tender Moments (Blue Note, 1967)
With Dinah Washington
 Dinah Washington Sings Fats Waller (1957)
 Dinah Sings Bessie Smith (1958)
 The Bessie Smith Songbook (1958)
With Reggie Workman
 Summit Conference (1994)
 Cerebral Caverns (1995)

References

External links
Biography at Postcard Records

1935 births
Living people
American jazz composers
American jazz trombonists
Male trombonists
Avant-garde jazz musicians
Cornish College of the Arts faculty
Free jazz trombonists
American male jazz composers
ECM Records artists
Milestone Records artists
Postcards Records artists
Riverside Records artists
Sun Ra Arkestra members
21st-century trombonists